Vejrø is a Danish island north of Lolland.

The island is private property; for tourists, it offers a marina, an airfield, and some cottages for rent.

External links
 Vejrø

Geography of Lolland Municipality
Islands of Denmark